Bera (Bira) is a Bantu language of the Democratic Republic of the Congo. It is close to Amba.

References

Biran languages